Phrurolinillus is a genus of European araneomorph spiders first described by Jörg Wunderlich in 1995. Originally placed with the Corinnidae, it was moved to the Phrurolithidae in 2014.  it contains only two species from the Iberian Peninsula.

References

External links

Araneomorphae genera
Phrurolithidae